The 1974 Queensland state election was held on 7 December 1974.

Retiring Members
Note: Cooroora National MLA David Low and Flinders National MLA Bill Longeran resigned shortly before the election; no by-elections were held.

Labor
Pat Hanlon MLA (Baroona)
Alec Inch MLA (Mount Isa)
Eugene O'Donnell MLA (Belyando)
Doug Sherrington MLA (Salisbury)
Edwin Wallis-Smith MLA (Cook)

National
Sir Alan Fletcher MLA (Cunningham)
Henry McKechnie MLA (Carnarvon)
Wally Rae MLA (Gregory)

Liberal
Clive Hughes MLA (Kurilpa)
Douglas Tooth MLA (Ashgrove)

Candidates
Sitting members at the time of the election are shown in bold text.

See also
 1974 Queensland state election
 Members of the Queensland Legislative Assembly, 1972–1974
 Members of the Queensland Legislative Assembly, 1974–1977
 List of political parties in Australia

References
 

Candidates for Queensland state elections